In mathematics, specifically the theory of Lie algebras, Lie's theorem states that, over an algebraically closed field of characteristic zero, if  is a finite-dimensional representation of a solvable Lie algebra, then there's a flag  of invariant subspaces of  with ,  meaning that  for each  and i.

This is a generalization of the result of Frobenius that commuting matrices are simultaneously upper triangularizable, as commuting matrices generate an abelian Lie algebra, which is a fortiori solvable.

A consequence of Lie's theorem  is that any finite dimensional solvable Lie algebra over a field of characteristic 0 has a nilpotent derived algebra (see #Consequences).

Counter-example 
For algebraically closed fields of characteristic p>0 Lie's theorem holds provided the dimension of the representation is less than p (see the proof below), but can fail for representations of dimension p. An example is given by the 3-dimensional nilpotent Lie algebra spanned by 1, x, and d/dx acting on the p-dimensional vector space k[x]/(xp), which has no eigenvectors. Taking the semidirect product of this 3-dimensional Lie algebra by the p-dimensional representation (considered as an abelian Lie algebra) gives a solvable Lie algebra whose derived algebra is not nilpotent.

Proof 
(Note: the structure of the proof is very similar to that for Engel's theorem.) We also assume V is not zero. For simplicity, we write .

Step 1: Observe that the theorem is equivalent to the statement:<ref>{{harvnb|Serre|loc=Theorem 3{{}}}}</ref>
Conversely, if v is a common eigenvector, take  to its span and then  admits a common eigenvector in the quotient ; repeat the argument.

Let  be the derived algebra.

Step 3: There exists some linear functional  in  such that

is nonzero. This follows from the inductive hypothesis (it is easy to check that the eigenvalues determine a linear functional).

Step 4:  is a -invariant subspace. (Note this step proves a general fact and does not involve solvability.)

If  then it's obvious, so assume  and set recursively . Let  and  be the largest such that  are linearly independent. Then we'll prove that they generate U and thus  is a basis of U. Indeed, assume by contradiction that it's not the case and let  be the smallest such that , then obviously . We'll prove by induction that for every  and  there exist elements  of the base field such that  and

The  case is straightforward since . Since  is an ideal, it's , and thus

and the induction step follows. Applying this with  instead of X gives . On the other hand, U is also obviously an invariant subspace of Y, and so

since commutators have zero trace, and thus . Since  is invertible (because of the assumption on the characteristic of the base field),  and

and so .

Step 5: Finish up the proof by finding a common eigenvector.

Write  where L is a one-dimensional vector subspace.

 Consequences 
It follows easily that for each ,  has diagonal consisting of zeros; i.e.,  is a strictly upper triangular matrix. This implies that  is a nilpotent Lie algebra. Moreover, if the base field is not algebraically closed then solvability and nilpotency of a Lie algebra is unaffected by extending the base field to its algebraic closure. Hence, one concludes the statement (the other implication is obvious):A finite-dimensional Lie algebra  over a field of characteristic zero is solvable if and only if the derived algebra  is nilpotent.Lie's theorem also establishes one direction in Cartan's criterion for solvability:If V is a finite-dimensional vector space over a field of characteristic zero and  a Lie subalgebra, then  is solvable if and only if  for every  and .Indeed, as above, after extending the base field, the implication  is seen easily. (The converse is more difficult to prove.)

Lie's theorem (for various V) is equivalent to the statement:For a solvable Lie algebra  over an algebraically closed field of characteristic zero, each finite-dimensional simple -module (i.e., irreducible as a representation) has dimension one.Indeed, Lie's theorem clearly implies this statement. Conversely, assume the statement is true. Given a finite-dimensional -module V, let  be a maximal -submodule (which exists by finiteness of the dimension). Then, by maximality,  is simple; thus, is one-dimensional. The induction now finishes the proof.

The statement says in particular that a finite-dimensional simple module over an abelian Lie algebra is one-dimensional; this fact remains true over any base field since in this case every vector subspace is a Lie subalgebra.

Here is another quite useful application:Let  be a finite-dimensional Lie algebra over an algebraically closed field of characteristic zero with radical .

By Step 4 of the proof of Lie's theorem,  is also a -module; so . In particular, for each , . Now, .

See also 
Engel's theorem, which concerns a nilpotent Lie algebra.
Lie–Kolchin theorem, which is about a (connected) solvable linear algebraic group.

References

Sources 

.
 Jacobson, Nathan, Lie algebras, Republication of the 1962 original. Dover Publications, Inc., New York, 1979.  
Jean-Pierre Serre: Complex Semisimple Lie Algebras, Springer, Berlin, 2001. 

Theorems about algebras